Daniel Shawn Susac (born May 14, 2001) is an American professional baseball catcher in the Oakland Athletics organization.

Amateur career
Susac attended Jesuit High School in Carmichael, California, a suburb of Sacramento, where he played football and baseball. As a junior in 2019, he hit .378. He played in the Under Armour All-America Baseball Game at Wrigley Field that summer. His senior season in 2020 was cut short due to the COVID-19 pandemic. He originally committed to play college baseball at Oregon State University, but switched his commitment to the University of Arizona.

Susac immediately became Arizona's starting catcher as a freshman in 2021, playing in 61 games with sixty being starts. He slashed .335/.383/.591 with 12 home runs, 64 RBIs, and 24 doubles, earning the title of Pac-12 Conference Freshman of the Year as well as being named All-Conference and to the All-Defensive Team. He was selected to play for the USA Baseball Collegiate National Team that summer. He also played for the Lincoln Potters of the California Collegiate League. Susac returned as Arizona's starting catcher in 2022 and entered the season as a top prospect for the upcoming draft. On March 14, 2022, he was named the National Player of the Week by Collegiate Baseball Newspaper as well as Pac-12 Player of the Week after he batted .526 with three home runs and 11 RBIs over four games. He finished the season having appeared in 64 games, compiling a .366/.430/.582 slash line with 12 home runs, 61 RBIs, and 100 hits. Following the season's end, he traveled to San Diego where he participated in the Draft Combine.

Professional career
Susac was selected by the Oakland Athletics in the first round with the 19th overall selection of the 2022 Major League Baseball draft. He signed with the team for $3.5 million.

Susac made his professional debut with the Arizona Complex League Athletics and was promoted to the Stockton Ports after two games. Over 27 games between both teams, he batted .298 with one home run and 15 RBIs.

Personal life
Susac's older brother, Andrew, has played six seasons of Major League Baseball. His cousin, Anthony, also plays on the Arizona baseball team.

References

External links
Arizona Wildcats bio

2001 births
Living people
People from Roseville, California
Baseball players from California
Baseball catchers
Arizona Wildcats baseball players
United States national baseball team players
Arizona Complex League Athletics players